The 2021 America East women's basketball tournament began on February 28 and concluded with the championship game on March 12. Stony Brook won their first conference title and advanced to the 2021 NCAA tournament. Only six teams competed, as Binghamton, Hartford, UMBC, and Vermont suspended their seasons in January and February, due to COVID-19 issues.

Seeds
Teams are seeded by record within the conference.

Schedule
All tournament games are nationally televised on an ESPN network:

Bracket and Results
Teams with highest remaining seeds receive home court advantage.

See also
 2021 America East men's basketball tournament

References

External links
 2021 America East Women's Basketball Championship

America East Conference women's basketball tournament
2020–21 America East Conference women's basketball season